On the Resting-Places of the Saints is a heading given to two early medieval pieces of writing, also known as Þá hálgan and the Secgan, which exist in various manuscript forms in both Old English and Latin, the earliest surviving manuscripts of which date to the mid-11th century.  Secgan is so named from its Old English incipit, Secgan be þam Godes sanctum þe on Engla lande aerost reston "Tale of God's saints who first rested in England"), and is a list of fifty places which had shrines and remains of Anglo-Saxon saints.  Þá hálgan (pronounced thar halgan) is a version of the so-called Kentish Royal Legend (its incipit Her cyð ymbe þa halgan þe on Angelcynne restað "Here [follows] a relation on the saints who rest in the English nation") is a heading which appears to be for both texts, as the Kentish legend, which comes first, is actually an account of how various members of the royal family of Kent, descendants of Æthelberht of Kent, founded monasteries and came to be regarded as saints. As such it is closer to other hagiographical texts than to the list of burial sites that follows it. The texts describe people living from the 7th to 10th centuries, and they exist in both Old English and Latin versions, but both have their earliest known manuscripts dating from the 11th century.

The Manuscripts
The two texts now known as 'Þá hálgan' and 'Secgan' are known from two extant manuscripts written in Old English, that were transcribed in the 11th century. The manuscript known as Stowe MS 944, (folia 29v-39r), the older of the two, is thought to have been written shortly after 1031. Rollason (1978) argues that  the scribe was including material dating to as early as the mid 9th century (for example the reference to Ubbanford).

Stowe MS 944 is a bound volume now in the British Library, the full scanned images of which are at British Library Online. It begins with a history of Hyde Abbey, Winchester, written in 1771, followed by a wide collection of much older original source documents. A selection of medieval drawings, is followed by a Liber vitae, written in 1031 consisting of lists of names of brethren and benefactors of the New Minster, also at Winchester, and substantially annotated. Other historiographical texts follow, including the will of King Ælfred. The two documents being considered here, originally composed entirely separately, were then written into the same Old English manuscript, under a combined heading of 'On the Resting-Places of the Saints'. However, it is the second document ('Secgan') which provided the list of saints. The first, ('Þá hálgan') includes mention of many saints, particularly those relating to Kent, but written as part of a narrative of the Kentish Royal Legend.
Her Cyðymbe þa halgan þe on Angel cynne restað: a treatise on the family of the Kentish kings, their holy character and works (ff. 34v-36v).
 Her onygynð secgean be þam Godes s[an]c[tu]m þe on engla lande ærest reston: a treatise, in continuation of the preceding, showing the places, with their adjacent waters, in England, and one place in Ireland, where the Saints' remains are deposited (ff. 36v-39r).

CCCC 201: The two documents are found in substantially the same (but not identical) form in the Parker Library, Corpus Christi College, Cambridge (CCCC 201, pp. 149–151). CCCC 201 is a substantial 3-volume set of manuscripts, with 96 constituent pieces of writing, in various 'hands' (different people's handwriting). Mostly written in Old English, it begins with Homilies of St Wolfstan.

Vitellius D: A third OE version was in the Cotton library's Vitellius D. xvii. Unfortunately this volume was destroyed in the fire of 1731.

Vitellius A3: This is one of several Latin translations of the Old English texts. It survived the 1731 fire and is now in the British Library's Cotton Vitellius A 3 ff3-5. Both extant OE texts and this Latin version were  published by Felix Liebermann as Die Heiligen Englands: Angelsächsisch unt Lateinisch, a German volume published in 1889, which is still the only scholarly published version of these texts.

Þá hálgan

Þá hálgan is a version of a wider group of texts on the Kentish Royal Legend, and deals with the earliest Christian kings of Kent and their families, and their pious acts, starting with the baptism of king Æthelberht of Kent by Augustine in AD 597. The text traces four generations after Æthelberht, spanning the 7th century and thus the entire period of the Christianization of England. In addition to the extensive genealogy, (in which members of the family marry into the royal families of Mercia, Northumbria and East Anglia) it has an account of the foundation of the Abbey at Minster-in-Thanet, bound up with the lives of two murdered brothers Æthelred and Æthelberht, the founding Abbess at Thanet, Domne Eafe, and her daughter saint Mildthryth.

The particular version of the Legend that accompanies the list of saints below mentions many Kentish saints and their resting places, and thus complements well the Secgan list, which has very few entries from that area. It is possible that a compiler had access to a specifically Kentish list that he drew on while collating his material. In addition to those mentioned above, Þá hálgan notes Æthelburh of Kent (who rests at Lyminge), Eanswith (Folkestone), Eormengyth (near Thanet), Ermenilda (Ely), Seaxburh (Ely), Æthelthryth (Ely), Werburgh (Hanbury, then Chester), Eorcengota (overseas).

Secgan
The Secgan (abbreviated R.P.S. in the Oxford Dictionary of Saints) is a list of 54 places in England where saints' remains are deposited, listing a total of 89 saints, of whom 79 were active in England.  The list is itemized with a formulaic Ðonne, e.g. 
 Ðonne resteð sanctus Congarus confessor on Cungresbirig (37b, "then, St Congar the confessor rests in Congresbury") 
in many cases the site is further identified by a topographical feature, mostly a river, e.g.
 Ðonne resteð sanctus Iohannes biscop on þare stowe Beferlic, neah þare ea Hul (5a, "then, St John the bishop rests at the site Beverley, near the River Hull"). In addition to the two Old English versions, there are a larger number of manuscripts with the same, or very similar material in Latin. Some of these appear to be direct translations of these known OE lists, while others are from earlier, or divergent lists as the names and places do not have a match in every instance. The list below summarises the names and places from both the Old English lists, and the Latin Secgan of Liebermann's 'V' manuscript.

List of the Saints and their resting places

Notes on the list

See also
Anglo-Saxon Christianity
Anglo-Saxon saints
List of Anglo-Saxon saints

References

Bibliography
G. Hickes, Dissertatio Epistolaris in Linguarum veterum septentrionalium thesaurus grammatico-criticus et archeologicus (Oxford 1703-05), p. 115
 (Contains the full text of both Þá hálgan and Secgan in Old English and Latin. Available in various digital formats via archive.org)
Susan J. Ridyard, The Royal Saints of Anglo-Saxon England: A Study of West Saxon and East Anglican Cults, Cambridge Studies in Medieval Life and Thought: Fourth Series, 1988.
.
David Hugh Farmer, The Oxford Dictionary of Saints, Oxford Paperback Reference, Publisher Oxford University Press, 1992, 2004.

External links
Þá hálgan (aka The Kentish Royal Legend) at www.alarichall.org.uk. (Three different text versions of the legend)
British Library Digitised Manuscript with the Old English Stowe MS 944 manuscript copy of the text from the mid 11th century. Þá hálgan begins on f.34v. Secgan begins on f.36v.

 
Christian hagiography
Old English literature
11th-century Christian texts
Texts of Anglo-Saxon England
English toponymy